Teddington is a suburb in south-west London in the London Borough of Richmond upon Thames. In 2021, Teddington was named as the best place to live in London by The Sunday Times.  Historically in Middlesex, Teddington is situated on a long meander of the Thames between Hampton Wick and Strawberry Hill, Twickenham. Mostly residential, it stretches from the river to Bushy Park with a long high street of shops, restaurants and pubs. There is a suspension bridge over the lowest non-tidal lock on the Thames, Teddington Lock. At Teddington's centre is a mid-rise urban development, containing offices and apartments.

Economy
Teddington is bisected by an almost continuous road of shops, offices and other facilities running from the river to Bushy Park. There are two clusters of offices on this route; on the edge of Bushy Park the National Physical Laboratory, National Measurement Office and LGC form a scientific centre. Around Teddington station and the town centre are a number of offices in industries such as direct marketing and IT, which include Tearfund and BMT Limited. Several riverside businesses and houses were redeveloped in the last quarter of the 20th century as blocks of riverside flats. As of 2016 the riverside site of the former Teddington Studios was being developed to provide modern apartment blocks and other smaller houses.

The lowermost lock on the Thames, Teddington Lock, which is just within Ham's boundary, is accessible via the Teddington Lock Footbridges. In 2001 the Royal National Lifeboat Institution opened the Teddington Lifeboat Station, one of four Thames lifeboat stations, below the lock on the Teddington side. The station became operational in January 2002 and is the only volunteer station on the river.

History

Etymology
The place was known in Saxon and Norman times as Todyngton and Tutington.

Teddington's beginnings

Bushy House was built in 1663, and its notable residents included British Prime Minister Lord North who lived there for over twenty years.
There have been isolated findings of flint and bone tools from the Mesolithic and Neolithic periods in Bushy Park and some unauthenticated evidence of Roman occupation. However, the first permanent settlement in Teddington was probably in Saxon times. Teddington was not mentioned in the Domesday Book of 1086 as it was included under the Hampton entry.

Teddington Manor was first owned by Benedictine monks in Staines and it is believed they built a chapel dedicated to St. Mary on the same site as today's St. Mary's Church. In 971, a charter gave the land in Teddington to the Abbey of Westminster. By the 14th century Teddington had a population of 100–200; most of the land was owned by the Abbot of Westminster and the remainder was rented by tenants who had to work the fields a certain number of days a year.

The Hampton Court gardens were laid out in 1500 in preparation for the planned rebuilding of a 14th-century manor to form Hampton Court Palace in 1521 and were to serve as hunting grounds for Cardinal Wolsey and later Henry VIII and his family. In 1540 some common land of Teddington was enclosed to form Bushy Park and acted as more hunting grounds.

A large minority of the parish lay in largely communal open fields, restricted in the Middle Ages to certain villagers. These were inclosed (privatised) in two phases, in 1800 and 1818.  Shortly afterwards, the  Duke of Clarence lived there with his mistress Dorothy Jordan before he became King William IV, and later with his Queen Consort, Adelaide of Saxe-Meiningen. The facilities were later converted into the National Physical Laboratory.

Economic change
In subsequent centuries, Teddington enjoyed a prosperous life due to the proximity of royalty, and by 1800 had grown significantly. But the "Little Ice Age" had made farming much less profitable and residents were forced to find other work. This change resulted in great economic change in the 19th century.

The first major event was the construction of Teddington Lock in 1811 with its weir across the river. This was the first (and now the biggest) of five locks built at the time by the City of London Corporation. In 1889 Teddington Lock Footbridge, consisting of a suspension bridge section and a girder bridge section, was completed, linking Teddington to Ham (then in Surrey, now in London). It was funded by local business and public subscription.

After the railway was built in 1863, easy travel to Twickenham, Richmond, Kingston and London was possible and Teddington experienced a population boom, rising from 1,183 in 1861 to 6,599 in 1881 and 14,037 in 1901.

Many roads and houses were built, continuing into the 20th century, forming the close-knit network of Victorian and Edwardian streets present today. In 1867, a local board was established and an urban district council in 1895.

In 1864 a group of Christians left the Anglican Church of St. Mary's (upset at its high church tendencies) and formed their own independent and Reformed, Protestant-style, congregation at Christ Church. Their original church building stood on what is now Church Road.

The Victorians attempted to build a large church, St. Alban's, based on the Notre Dame de Paris; however, funds ran out and only the nave of what was to be the "Cathedral of the Thames Valley" was completed. In 1993 the temporary wall was replaced with a permanent one as part of a refurbishment that converted St Alban's Church into the Landmark Arts Centre, a venue for concerts and exhibitions.

A new cemetery, Teddington Cemetery, opened at Shacklegate Lane in 1879.

Several schools were built in Teddington in the late 19th century in response to the 1870 Education Act, putting over 2,000 children in schools by 1899, transforming the previously illiterate village.

20th century
On 26 April 1913 a train was almost destroyed in Teddington after an arson attack by suffragettes.

Great change took place around the turn of the 20th century in Teddington. Many new establishments were springing up, including Sims opticians. In 1902 the National Physical Laboratory (NPL), the national measurement standards laboratory for the United Kingdom, and the largest applied physics organisation in the UK, started in Bushy House (primarily working in industry and metrology and where the first accurate atomic clock was built) and the Teddington Carnegie Library was built in 1906. Electricity was also now supplied to Teddington, allowing for more development.

Until this point, the only hospital had been the very small cottage hospital, but it could not accommodate the growing population, especially during the First World War. Money was raised over the next decade to build Teddington Memorial Hospital in 1929.

By the beginning of the Second World War, by far the greatest source of employment in Teddington was in the NPL. Its main focus in the war was military research and its most famous invention, the "bouncing bomb", was developed. During the war General Dwight D. Eisenhower planned the D-Day landings at his Supreme Headquarters Allied Expeditionary Force (SHAEF) at Camp Griffiss in Bushy Park.

The "towpath murders" took place across the river in 1953. On 1 June, Barbara Songhurst was discovered floating in the River Thames, having been stabbed four times. Her friend Christine Reed, then missing, was found dead on 6 June. On 28 June, Alfred Whiteway was arrested for their murder and the sexual assault of three other women that same year. Whiteway was hanged at Wandsworth Prison on 22 November 1953. Whiteway and the girls were all from Teddington. The case was described as "one of Scotland Yard's most notable triumphs in a century".

Teddington Studios, a digital widescreen television studio complex and one of the former homes of Thames Television, opened in 1958.

Most major rebuilding from bomb damage in World War II was completed by 1960. Chain stores began to open up, including Tesco and Sweatshop in 1971.

The Teddington Society
The Teddington Society, formed in 1973 by local residents, seeks to preserve the character of Teddington and to support local community projects.

Education

The education authority for Teddington is Richmond upon Thames London Borough Council.

Primary schools in Teddington include Collis Primary School (Fairfax Road), St Mary's & St Peter's Primary School (Church Road), Sacred Heart RC School (St Marks Road) and Stanley Juniors and Infants (Strathmore Road). Secondary schools include Teddington School.

St Mary's & St Peter's Primary School was originally founded by Dorothy Bridgeman (d. 1697), widow of Sir Orlando Bridgeman, who left £40 to buy land in trust for educating poor children. In 1832, the foundation opened a boys' school, Teddington Public School, under the patronage of Queen Adelaide. Its buildings now house the primary school.

Leisure

The Landmark Arts Centre, an independent charity, delivers a wide-ranging arts and education programme for the local and wider community. Its activities include arts classes, concerts and exhibitions.

Sport

Cricket and hockey clubs in Bushy Park
In the late 19th century, Bushy Park became home to Teddington Cricket Club. From this, stemmed Teddington Hockey Club in 1871, which was responsible for introducing important rules of the modern game of hockey including the striking circle and the "sticks" rule.
Others
 Kingston Royals Dragon Boat Racing Club
NPL Sports Club
 Royal Canoe Club, the oldest canoe club in the world
 The Skiff Club, the oldest skiff club in the world, also competes at punting under TPC rules.
Teddington Athletic FC
Teddington Rugby Football Club
Teddington Lawn Tennis Club
 Walbrook Rowing Club, also known as Teddington Rowing Club
Weirside AFC play at the Broom Road site; they have a clubhouse overlooking Teddington Lock.
Park Lane Stables a Riding for the Disabled Association equine facility

Transport

Nearest railway stations

 Teddington
 Hampton Wick
 Fulwell
 Strawberry Hill

Teddington railway station, served by South Western Railway trains, is on the electrified Kingston Loop Line close to the junction of the Shepperton Branch Line. Trains run both ways to London Waterloo: one way via Kingston upon Thames and Wimbledon every 15 minutes, the other via Richmond and Putney every 30 minutes. Trains also run to Shepperton every 30 minutes.

Buses
Teddington is served by London Buses services to other London locations, including Heathrow Airport, West Croydon and Hammersmith. Routes 33, 281, 285, 481, 681, R68 and X26 serve the town centre, and all seven connect the town with either Twickenham or Kingston upon Thames.

Geography

Demography and housing

Places of worship

 St Mary with St Alban Church of England parish church, built circa 1400. St Mary's is the original church; St Alban's, across the road, is now the Landmark Arts Centre
 Teddington Baptist Church – evangelical Baptist church
 Sacred Heart Church, Teddington – Roman Catholic church designed by John Kelly, opened in 1893
 St Mark's, Teddington – Church of England
 Teddington Methodist Church
 Christ Church, Teddington – an independent congregation worshipping in Church of England style
 St Peter & St Paul, Teddington – Church of England

Notable residents

Only notable people with entries on Wikipedia have been included. Their birth or residence has been verified by citations.

Living people
Mo Farah, Olympian long-distance runner, has a home in Teddington 
Julian Clary, English actor, comedian, novelist and presenter, was brought up in Teddington.
Andrew Gilligan, journalist and policy adviser, was born in Teddington.
Viv Groskop, journalist, writer and comedian, lives in Teddington.
Keira Knightley, actress, grew up in Teddington.
Jed Mercurio, creator of Line of Duty, lives in Teddington.

Historical figures

 The Dowager Queen Adelaide (1792–1849), widow of William IV, spent her last years (1837–1849) at Bushy House, Teddington.
Luffman Atterbury (1740–1796), composer and builder, lived at a house now known as Clarence House, between Middle Lane and Park Lane facing Park Road, from 1780 until 1790.
 Rear-Admiral Valentine Collard (c. 1770–1846), served in the French Revolutionary and Napoleonic Wars.
Sir Noël Coward (1899–1973), actor, playwright and songwriter, was born at 131 Waldegrave Road, Teddington. There is a bust of Coward, sculpted by Avril Vellacott, in Teddington Library, which is only a short distance away.
 Dorothy Edwards (1914–1982), children's author, was born in Teddington.
 Stephen Hales (1677–1761), clergyman who made major contributions to a range of scientific fields.
 Benny Hill (1924–1992), comedian, actor, singer and writer, lived and died at Flat 7, Fairwater House, 34 Twickenham Road, Teddington.
 Prince Louis, Duke of Nemours (1814–1896), lived at Bushy House.
Eugène Marais (1871–1936), South African lawyer, naturalist, poet and writer, lived in Coleshill Road in Teddington from 1898 to 1902.
Frederick North, Lord North (1732–1792), British statesman, Prime Minister from 1770 to 1782, lived at Bushy House as his London suburban residence when Ranger of Bushy Park, from 1771 to 1792.
 Norman Selfe (1839–1911), engineer, naval architect, inventor, urban planner and advocate of technical education, was born in Teddington.
John Thaxter (1927–2012), theatre critic, lived in Teddington.
 John Walter (1738–1812), who founded The Times newspaper and died at The Grove, Teddington.

Notes and references

Further reading
 Sheaf, John; Howe, Ken. Hampton and Teddington Past, Historical Publications, 1995. 
 Howe, Ken; Cherry, Mike. Twickenham, Teddington and Hampton in Old Photographs: A Second Selection (Britain in Old Photographs), Sutton Publishing, 1998.

External links

 British History Online – Teddington
 The Teddington Society

 
Districts of London on the River Thames
Districts of the London Borough of Richmond upon Thames
Places formerly in Middlesex
Wards of the London Borough of Richmond upon Thames
District centres of London